Secom Rugguts is a Japanese rugby union team founded in 1985 by SECOM. Its name is a portmanteau of "Rugger" and "Guts". The club was in the Top League for the first season of the league but was demoted at the end of the season. As the top team of the Top East league and by then coming second after Fukuoka Sanix Bombs in the three-way Top League Challenge Series, Secom got back into the Top League for the 2005-6 season but was relegated again in 2006-7.

On February 10, 2008 Secom's 3-10 loss to World Fighting Bull in the Top Challenge Two series ended its challenge to return to the Top League for the 2008-9 season.

Slogan for 2006 season: "Seize the day"

Squad

Notable playersSECOM RUGGUTS | RUGBY: FOR ALL

Japan
 Motohiro Akagi
 Kensuke Iwabuchi (Former Japan international)
 Tomohiro Oinuma (currently playing for Ricoh Black Rams)
 Noriyoshi Ohara  (currently Iwate Morioka High School RFC coach)
 Kota Kawashima (currently playing for Kintetsu Liners)
 Takashi Kamio
 Yoshiyuki Koike
 Takamasa Sawaguchi (former Japan international)
 Manabu Komatsu (currently playing for Mitsubishi Sagamihara DynaBoars)
 Yuta Sato (currently playing for Kamaishi Seawaves)
 Ken Suzuki
 Yosuke Shishido
 Manabu Suzuki
 Takashi Suzuki (currently playing for Kubota Spears and Japan Sevens)
 Naoto Tanemoto (former Rugguts coach and Japan international, Waseda University RFC coach)
 Yoshikazu Tamura (currently playing for Yamaha Jubilo)

Other Nationalities
 Brian Lima (Former Samoa international)
 Inoke Afeaki (Former Tonga international)
 Sene Ta'ala (Former Samoa international)
 Norman Ligairi (Former Fiji international)
 Seremaia Bai(Former Fiji international)
 Feleti Mahoni (Former Tonga international)
 Feleti Fakaongo (Former Tonga international)
 Penieli Latu (Former Tonga international)
Murray Paul Tocker , Secom Coach 2001-2003 , (Former Wellington Lions player 
Marist ST Pats Player )

See also
 Secom
 Top East League

Notes

External links
Secom Rugguts - official home page

Japanese rugby union teams
Rugby clubs established in 1985
Sports teams in Saitama Prefecture
1985 establishments in Japan